Eagle Point is a census-designated place in Shelby County, Alabama, United States. It was first listed as a CDP prior to the 2020 census and is part of the Birmingham Metropolitan Area. The area was struck by a long-tracked low-end EF3 tornado on March 25, 2021, damaging or destroying several homes and downing trees. Five people were injured by the tornado.

It was first named as a CDP in the 2020 Census which listed a population of 2,903.

Geography
The community is in northern Shelby County. It is bordered to the north by the city of Birmingham, to the east by Highland Lakes, to the south by Pelham, and to the west by Meadowbrook.

Demographics

2020 census

Note: the US Census treats Hispanic/Latino as an ethnic category. This table excludes Latinos from the racial categories and assigns them to a separate category. Hispanics/Latinos can be of any race.

References

Census-designated places in Shelby County, Alabama
Census-designated places in Alabama
Unincorporated communities in Alabama